Estádio Mourão Vieira Filho, usually known as Estádio da Rua Bariri, is a football stadium in Olaria neighborhood, Rio de Janeiro, Brazil. The stadium has a maximum capacity of 8,300 people. It was built in 1947.

Estádio da Rua Bariri is owned by Olaria Atlético Clube. The stadium is named after Mourão Vieira Filho, who was an alderman (vereador, in Portuguese language) and is the one who made possible the stadium construction. Bariri means rapid in a Tupi–Guarani language, and is the name of the street where the stadium is located.

The stadium is often rented to the big clubs of Rio de Janeiro, especially Flamengo, when they are not able to play at the Maracanã stadium.

History
In 1947, the works on Estádio da Rua Bariri were completed. The inaugural match was played on April 6 of that year, when Fluminense beat Vasco da Gama 4-3. The first goal of the stadium was scored by Vasco da Gama's Friaça.

The stadium's attendance record currently stands at 18,000, set on April 30, 1997, when Flamengo beat Bangu 3-1.

References

Enciclopédia do Futebol Brasileiro, Volume 2 – Lance, Rio de Janeiro: Aretê Editorial S/A, 2001.

External links
Templos do Futebol

Rua Bariri
Football venues in Rio de Janeiro (city)
Olaria Atlético Clube